Ramji Rao Speaking is a 1989 Indian Malayalam-language comedy-thriller film written and directed by the duo Siddique–Lal (in their directorial debut) and produced by Fazil, Swargachitra Appachan, and Ousepachan Vaalakuzhy. It stars Sai Kumar, Mukesh, Innocent, Vijayaraghavan, Devan, Rekha, with Sankaradi, Sukumari, Kunchan and Mamukkoya in other supporting roles. The film deals with social factors affecting Kerala including unemployment during the 1980s, and went on to achieve a cult classic status.

Ramji Rao Speaking marked the debut of director duo Siddique and Lal, actors Sai Kumar (first appearance in a notable role), Rekha, N. F. Varghese and Harishree Ashokan (both in minor roles), and music director S. Balakrishnan. Mannar Mathai Speaking (1995) and Mannar Mathai Speaking 2 (2014) are the sequels to the film.

The core plot of the movie was inspired by the 1971 TV movie See The Man Run. Fazil remade this film in Tamil as Arangetra Velai, with Mamukkoya and Vijayaraghavan reprising their role and the character of "Gopalakrishnan" being replaced by a female. Priyadarshan remade the film in Hindi, titled Hera Pheri. It was also remade in Telugu as Dhanalakshmi, I Love You, in Kannada as Trin Trin, in Odia as Wrong Number and in Bengali as Hera Pheri.

Plot 
The story revolves around three unemployed people (the third is a middle aged unsuccessful theatre owner). The story opens with the arrival of Balakrishnan in Kochi to dispute the denial of his company job which he was supposed to receive several years ago. Several candidates overtook his chance and the last one was Rani who pretends to be an influential figure, the daughter of Shivashankaran Panicker, a candidate who overtook his chance. Rani threatens Balakrishnan to continue to work despite his efforts to overthrow her. The company manager knows about her family situation and helps her keep the job. Balakrishnan is determined to stay in the town until he succeeds in getting the job.

During his stay, Balakrishnan finds a temporary lodging in 'Urvasi Theatre', owned by Mannar Mathai, with another tenant Gopalakrishnan, both unemployed and with insignificant earnings. Mathai is constantly pestered by calls intended for Urumees Thampan, a rich businessman, and vice versa. Initially, Gopalakrishnan does not like the new tenant because of a misunderstanding made by Balakrishnan that Gopalakrishnan is a pickpocket at the market, in vain. Gopalakrishnan is tricky and cunning. He lies to his mother by telling her that he works in a large company based in Calcutta and that he is building a new house in Kochi. Balakrishnan discovers the truth and mistakes Gopalakrishnan as a fraud. Gopalakrishnan makes Balakrishnan sign white paper and betrays him by writing a no-objection letter to Rani, thus giving her the job. Gopalakrishnan brings Balakrishnan's friend Hamzukkoya who is desperately searching for him to the house. Hamzukkoya threatens to commit suicide if he does not repay the debt of rupees 35000 he took for his sister's wedding, which Hamzukkoya wants to use for his daughter's wedding as fast as possible. He demands the money from Rani, but what shocks Balakrishnan most was the realisation of Rani's family situation, having a blind son who needs a surgery worth rupees 50000, which she had earlier demanded from Balakrishnan in return for the job. Balakrishnan gets drunk at night and reveals the fraud play of Gopalakrishnan, which Gopalakrishnan justifies as comforting his mother, who has had health issues, because Gopalakrishnan did not get a job months after passing out of college. The truth melts the minds of both Balakrishnan and Mannar Mathai. They all become friends enjoy the night despite their unending problems.

Early in dawn, Balakrishnan wakes up to a ringing telephone. A gang leader named Ramji Rao has kidnapped the daughter of Urumees Thampan and are asking for a ransom of one lakh rupees. The three unemployed have no relation with Urumees Thampan; the gang had apparently dialled the wrong number. Panicking, Balakrishan tries to find the number of Urumees Thampan from a phone directory, only to find out that the numbers of Urvasi Theaters and Urumees Thampan are interchanged in the directory. Gopalakrishnan comes up with an idea and asks Balakrishnan to act as a dealer between Ramji Rao with Urumees Thampan, without letting them know about each other, and demand a ransom of four lakh to Urumees Thampan, instead of a lakh, get the girl from Ramji Rao, and take the remaining three lakh for themselves. They narrowly escape Hamzukkoya who tries to assault Balakrishnan, who has not paid for the wedding. They find it difficult as the police suspect them and they find it hard to keep Urumees Thampan and Ramji Rao anonymous to each other. Finally, after a struggle, the three rescue the girl from the gang leader and hand her over to Urumees Thamapan. Ramji Rao is arrested, and they confess the ploy to him upon a police encounter. Gopalakrishnan gives Hamzukkoya his money, but is arrested along with Balakrishnan and Mannar Mathai soon after he reaches home. Urumees forgives them and is thankful for returning his daughter, and offers them the three lakh rupees as a reward, telling them that they do not have to stay at the police station for more than an hour. The film ends with the girl calling Urumees, mocking Ramji Rao.

Cast 

 Sai Kumar as Balakrishnan
 Mukesh as Gopalakrishnan
 Innocent as Mannar Mathai
 Vijayaraghavan as Ramji Rao
 Devan as Urumees Thampan
 Rekha as Rani
 Sankaradi as Hindustan Chemicals Manager
 Mamukkoya as Hamzakkoya
 Sukumari as Saraswati
 Kunchan as Mathai 
Alleppey Ashraf as Chemmeen Varghese
 N. F. Varghese as a Hindustan Chemicals staff member
 Harisree Asokan as a Sandhyav
 Amritam Gopinath as Matron
 M. L. Augustine as office peon
 Anjana as Nisha, Urumees Thampan's daughter
 P. C. George as the circle inspector of police
 Shiyas Basheer as Unni, Rani's brother.

Production 
The movie is directed by Siddique–Lal duo, who were assistants of Fazil. The film is also produced by Fazil.
Sai Kumar, son of late veteran actor Kottarakkara Sreedharan Nair made his acting debut with this film.

Soundtrack 
The film's soundtrack contains 4 songs, all composed by S. Balakrishnan in his debut, with the lyrics by Bichu Thirumala. This is the first movie A. R. Rahman programmed a song for a film; "Kalikalam".

Reception 
The film became a commercial success. In 1989, The Hindu wrote, "Siddique and Lal have to be complimented on their brilliant maiden venture, a rollicking comedy." Kalakaumudi wrote: "Sai Kumar makes an impressive debut...However it is Innocent who is the showstealer."

Remakes

Legacy 
Mukesh's mother's warden's dialogue in the film "Kambilipothappu" became a catchphrase.

References

External links 
 

1980s Malayalam-language films
1989 comedy films
1989 directorial debut films
1989 films
Fictional portrayals of the Kerala Police
Films shot in Alappuzha
Indian comedy thriller films
Speaking1
Malayalam films remade in other languages
Films directed by Siddique–Lal